HMS Rose was a 20-gun (Seaford-class) sixth-rate post ship of the Royal Navy, built at Blaydes Yard in Hull, England in 1757. Her activities in suppressing smuggling in the colony of Rhode Island provoked the formation of what became the Continental Navy, precursor of the modern United States Navy. She was based at the North American station in the West Indies and then used in the American Revolutionary War. She was scuttled in the harbour of Savannah, Georgia in 1779. A replica was built in 1970, then modified to match HMS Surprise, and used in two films, Master and Commander: Far Side of the World and Pirates of the Caribbean: On Stranger Tides.

Activities in North America
HMS Rose was built in Hull, England in 1757, as a 20 gun sixth-rate post ship for the British Royal Navy.  In the Seven Years' War, Rose was in service in the Channel and in the Caribbean. She was briefly considered for service as Captain James Cook's vessel on his first exploration of the Pacific, but was rejected as unable to stow the quantity of provisions required for the planned circumnavigation of the globe. Instead she was sent to the North American station, en route to which she encountered Cook's ultimate choice of vessel,  on 12 September 1768 when the two ships anchored alongside each other at Funchal in the Madeira Islands.

In 1774, Rose, under the command of Sir James Wallace, was sent to Narragansett Bay in Rhode Island to put an end to the smuggling that had made Newport the fourth wealthiest city in America. Since Rose was much larger than any American vessel of the time and Wallace was an effective commander, smuggling soon came almost to a standstill. On 22 February, 1775 she captured sloop Lively carrying contraband goods. On morning of 2 April, 1775 she ran aground on the north end of Goat Island, getting off that evening.  On 26 April, 1775 she seized the sloops Diana and Abigal. On 2 May, 1775 she seized a sloop one of the Providence Paquets. This severely affected the economy of Newport. Rhode Island's merchants petitioned their colonial legislature to create a navy to deal with Wallace. They backed up their petitions with money by fitting out a merchant vessel for naval service. This vessel was commissioned as the sloop-of-war , which became the first naval command of John Paul Jones. Rhode Island declared its independence from Britain on 4 May 1776, two full months before the rest of the colonies. The petitioning of the Continental Congress to form a naval force to rid Narragansett Bay of Rose was the impetus for the creation of the Continental Navy.

Wallace was knighted for his actions in helping to drive George Washington and his troops from the city of New York. She also patrolled the rest of the northeast coast of America, pressing sailors from merchant vessels and seeking out provisions for the British garrison at Boston.

On 27 January, 1779 she captured a prize in Chesapeake Bay.

Scuttled in Savannah, Georgia

Rose finally met her end in 1779 in Savannah, Georgia. The British, who were occupying the city, scuttled Rose in a narrow part of the channel, effectively blocking it. Consequently, the French fleet was unable to assist the American assault and Savannah remained in British hands until the war's end. After the war Rose was destroyed to clear the channel. Though only a few artefacts have been recovered by dredging over the years, the United States Army Corps of Engineers recovered three cannons and an anchor from the Savannah River, believed to be from HMS Rose.

HMS Rose replica

In 1970 a replica of HMS Rose was built in Lunenburg, Nova Scotia. She was also named HMS Rose and initially intended as a "dockside attraction," used for display and later sail training. In 1991 the ship gained the United States Coast Guard certification as a sail training vessel. She took part in many maritime events, among them in the huge Tall Ship Race "Columbus 500" in 1992. In 2001, she was purchased by Fox Studios, sailed to Southern California, and altered to resemble  for the Peter Weir movie Master and Commander: The Far Side of the World, based on the books by Patrick O'Brian. Renamed Surprise, the vessel is now a part of the Maritime Museum of San Diego as a dockside attraction.

References

Further reading 

 
 
 The replica Rose's website

Post ships of the Royal Navy
Military units and formations of Great Britain in the American Revolutionary War
1757 ships
Maritime incidents in 1779
Scuttled vessels of the United Kingdom